The Laurens County School District is a public school district in Laurens County, Georgia, United States, based in Dublin. It serves communities outside of Dublin: Cadwell, Dexter, Dudley, East Dublin, Lovett, Montrose, and Rentz, as well as the Laurens County portion of Allentown. Dublin is within the Dublin City School District.

Schools
The Laurens County School District has four elementary schools, two middle schools, and two high schools.

Elementary schools:
East Laurens Elementary School
East Laurens Primary School
Northwest Laurens Elementary
Southwest Laurens Elementary

Middle schools:
East Laurens Middle School
West Laurens Middle School

High schools:
East Laurens High School
West Laurens High School

See also 
List of school districts in Georgia

References

External links

School districts in Georgia (U.S. state)
Education in Laurens County, Georgia
Educational institutions with year of establishment missing